Chinnakanal  is a village in Idukki district in the Indian state of Kerala. The waterfalls here are popularly known as Power House Waterfalls.

Demographics
As of 2011 Census, Chinnakanal had a population of 12,005 with 6,098 males and 5,907 females. In Chinnakanal, 9.6% of the population was under 6 years of age. Chinnakanal had an average literacy of 78.6% higher than the national average of 74% and lower than state average of 94%: male literacy was 86.2% and female literacy was 70.8%.

References

Villages in Idukki district